The Boa Vista Island Cup, also known as Bubista Cup under the Boa Vista Creole name (ALUPEC: Taça da Dja da Boa Bista or Bubista) is a regional cup competition played during the season in the island of Sal, Cape Verde, it consists of all eight clubs of the island and are divided into three or four rounds.. The competition is organized by the Boa Vista Regional Football Association.  The cup competition was founded in 2008 and first played in 2009 and is the third youngest in the country.  The cup winner competes in the regional super cup final in the following season, when a cup winner also won the championship, a runner-up competes.  For several seasons, the winner qualified into Cape Verdean Cup which has been cancelled due to financial and scheduling reasons.

Its recent cup winner is Sport Sal Rei Club and is the club who won the most cup titles numbering six.  The upcoming cup final will be on March 31, another Boa Vista Derby will appear as it will feature Sal Rei and Académica Operária

Winners

Performance by club

Performance by area

See also
Boa Vista Island League
Boa Vista Island Super Cup
Boa Vista Opening Tournament

Notes

References

External links
Boa Vista Football Association 

Sport in Boa Vista, Cape Verde
Football cup competitions in Cape Verde
2009 establishments in Cape Verde
Recurring sporting events established in 2009